Leukocyte immunoglobulin-like receptor subfamily A member 5 (LILR-A5) also known as CD85 antigen-like family member F (CD85f), immunoglobulin-like transcript 7 (ILT-7), and leukocyte immunoglobulin-like receptor 9 (LIR-9) is a protein that in humans is encoded by the LILRA5 gene. This gene is one of the leukocyte receptor genes that form a gene cluster on the chromosomal region 19q13.4. Four alternatively spliced transcript variants encoding distinct isoforms have been described.

Function 
The function of LILRA5 is currently unknown. However, it is highly homologous to other LILR genes, thus it is assumed to have similar functions to other LIR family members, i.e. activating and inhibitory functions in leukocytes. Crosslink of this receptor protein on the surface of monocytes has been shown to induce calcium flux and secretion of several proinflammatory cytokines, which suggests the roles of this protein in triggering innate immune responses.

Clinical significance 
A recent genome-wide association study (GWAS) has found that genetic variations in LILRA5 are associated with late-onset sporadic Alzheimer’s disease (LOAD).

LILBR2 plays a critical role in the inhibition of axonal regeneration and functional recovery after brain injury. However, recent studies demonstrate that LILRB2 is a β-Amyloid receptor and may contribute to synaptic loss and cognitive impairment in Alzheimer's disease. Due to its proximity to LILRB2, it is believed that LILRA5 mutation may also contribute to Alzheimer's disease.

References